State Highway 70 (SH 70) is a State Highway in Kerala, India that starts in Punnakkad and ends in Melattur. The highway is 9.82 km long.

The Route Map 
Punnakkal – dapatta – Melattoor (Joins Kumaramputhur - Olipuzha road)

See also 
Roads in Kerala
List of State Highways in Kerala

References 

State Highways in Kerala
Roads in Ernakulam district